Ásmundur Einar Daðason (born 29 October 1982) is an Icelandic politician. He was a member of the Althing for the Northwest Constituency from 2009 to 2016 – first for the Left-Green Movement (VG), later for the centrist Progressive Party. He returned to the Althing in 2017. He has also been the leader of the organisation Heimssýn, which gathers Iceland's EU opponents. On November 30, 2017, he became Minister of Social Affairs and Equality. On November 28, 2021, he became Minister of Education and Children.

Career

Minister of Social Affairs and Children

Ásmundur Einar was appointed Minister of Social Affairs and Children in the Jakobsdottir cabinet after government negotiations following the 2017 election. Following the 2021 election, he was appointed Minister of Education and Children.

After taking office as a minister in 2017, Ásmundur Einar declared that his main emphasis as a minister would be services provided for children. He declared wanting to make large-scale changes in the systems that provide services to children in Iceland. On December 31, 2018, he changed the ministerial title to reflect his focus on children's rights and became Minister of Social Affairs and Children, the first minister for children in Iceland. In 2020, in a personal interview with Morgunblaðið, Ásmundur Einar described his youth and upbringing and the effects that experience had had on his adult life. Based on that experience, Ásmundur Einar emphasised his first hand knowledge of how it feels to be a child in an environment where not everything is up to par and assistance is needed. 

In 2020, Ásmundur Einar presented a bill to the Icelandic Parliament on the Integration of Services in the Interest of Children's Prosperity. The bill was accompanied by two other bills, one on the National Agency for Children and Families and the other on the National Supervisory Authority for Welfare for Integrating Services in the Interest of Children's Prosperity. The two are new institutions, founded on the basis of two currently operating institutions, and their role would be to oversee the implementation and activities based on the new law on the Integration of Services in the Interest of Children's Prosperity. The bill was passed into law in the spring of 2021 and took effect on January 1, 2022.

Ásmundur Einar has planned to present further bills, changing other laws regarding services for children to support the abovementioned law. In 2021 a change to the law on child protection was passed and a second bill to further conclude changes to that law are imminent. Later, there will be bills that will entail changes to various laws to support the abovementioned law, e.g. regarding education systems, sports, health care, and other resources for children’s prosperity.

Ásmundur Einar presented a bill for a new law on parental leave in Iceland in 2020 that would increase the time of paid parental leave from 9 months to 12 months, equally divided between both parents (if the child in question had two parents). The bill was passed in late 2020. Every child born, adopted or permanently fostered on or after January 1, 2021, is able to stay home with its parents for 12 months on a paid parental leave. The law is considerate towards single parents, granting them 12 months unshared and financially aids parents who need to travel great distances for medical assistance before/during birth. The wording of the new law is gender neutral.

On 13 January 2021, Ásmundur Einar announced that he would run for Parliament in Reykjavík North Constituency, after serving four terms for Northwest Constituency. In September 2021, he was elected into Parliament for that constituency and appointed minister in November of the same year.

The new ministerial title; Minister of Education and Children, is a new combination. The ministry directed by the Minister of Education and Children houses child protection, children with complex needs, the new Prosperity Law, sport and youth programs, as well as children’s education from pre-school (ages 1 to 6 years), primary school (ages 6 to 16 years) and college (mostly ages 16 to 19). This is integral in combining most systematic points of interest regarding children’s prosperity and is integral in fulfilling the goal of the new Prosperity Law.

References

External links 
 Non auto-biography of Ásmundur Einar Daðason on the parliament

Living people
1982 births
Asmundur Einar Dadason
Asmundur Einar Dadason
Asmundur Einar Dadason
Asmundur Einar Dadason
Asmundur Einar Dadason